Eros Nazareno Mancuso (born 17 April 1999) is an Argentine footballer currently playing as a right-back for Estudiantes.

Career statistics

Club

Notes

References

1999 births
Living people
Argentine footballers
Footballers from Buenos Aires
People from Morón Partido
Association football defenders
Argentine Primera División players
Boca Juniors footballers
Estudiantes de La Plata footballers